Crépin is a French surname. Notable people with the surname include:

Alain Crépin (born 1954), Belgian saxophonist and composer
François Crépin (1830–1903), Belgian botanist
Jean Crépin (1908-1996), French Army general
Louis-Philippe Crépin (1772–1851), French painter
Malin Crépin (born 1978), Swedish actress  
Margit Otto-Crépin (born 1945), French equestrian

See also
Saint-Crépin (disambiguation), various communes in France
Crépin Point, headland in the South Shetland Islands

French-language surnames